Sadiq is an Indian actor working in Malayalam cinema. He has acted more than 500 Malayalam films. He is an actor who handles supporting and villain roles. He was a theatre artist before making his film debut in the 1987 film Uppu.

Personal life
Sadiq was born to Hamza and Khadeeja at Thrissur, Kerala. He studied in CMS Boys School, Thrissur. He is married to Shajitha, who works as a practitioner of homeopathy. They have two daughters, Rubina and Thamanna. Thamanna sang a few lines in the song Vellaaram Kannulla from the 2014 Malayalam movie Vellimoonga.

Filmography

Television serials
Maya (Sun TV) - Tamil
Mohapakshikal (Kairali TV)
Bhagyadevatha (Mazhavil Manorama)
MT Kadhakal (Amrita TV)
Purnarjani (Doordarshan)
Sathyam (Amrita TV)
Sthree (Asianet)
Prayanam (Doordarshan)

References

External links

Sadiq at MSI

Indian male film actors
Male actors from Thrissur
Male actors in Malayalam cinema
Living people
Year of birth missing (living people)
20th-century Indian male actors
21st-century Indian male actors
Indian male television actors
Male actors in Malayalam television